The 1991 Montana State Bobcats football team was an American football team that represented Montana State University in the Big Sky Conference during the 1991 NCAA Division I-AA football season. In their fifth and final season under head coach Earle Solomonson, the Bobcats compiled a 2–9 record (1–7 against Big Sky opponents) and finished in a tie for last place in the Big Sky.

Schedule

References

Montana State
Montana State Bobcats football seasons
Montana State Bobcats football